Koi Laut Ke Aaya Hai is an Indian suspensive psychological thriller TV series that was broadcast on Star Plus in 2017. Backed by Sphere Origins, it starred Surbhi Jyoti, Shoaib Ibrahim, Sharad Kelkar, Shaleen Malhotra ,  Rajsingh Verma and Varun Buddhadev. In June 2021, the series was released as The Return on quix.

Plot
 
Rishabh, a blind person lives with his Rajput family. His sister, Geetanjali falls in love with military officer Abhimanyu. As Rishabh refuses for this alliance, Geetanjali disobeys him and marries Abhimanyu. Though initially, outraged, he later accepts Abhimanyu who dies in a car crash.

Six years later

As Abhimanyu's body was never found, Geetanjali waits for his return. Her childhood friend, army officer Rajveer Malhotra, reveals Indian Army hasn't found any trace of Abhimanyu's survival so he is dead. Geetanjali meets a 6 year-old Priyam. Claiming to be Abhimanyu's reincarnation, Priyam is tested to know his identity but surprisingly passes. His greedy parents permit him to be adopted by Rishabh for Geetanjali's sake in exchange for a handsome sum.

Ragini, a stranger claims to be related to Geetanjali. It turns out that Abhimanyu is alive, and finally Geetanjali catches him, who says he betrayed her for revenge against her family. Ratna reveals how she was raped by his father Bhavani when she was pregnant with his child but he got her married to the widower Rajesh Shekhari, Geetanjali's father. Kavya is in fact Bhavani and Ratna's daughter.

Now, the biggest truth comes out that not Abhimanyu, it is his identical twin Aditya who is seeking revenge from his own family, as Bhavani wanted to kill him in past when it was predicated Aditya would cause his death. But Aditya was saved and raised by another guy with the story of Bhavani's abandonment etched into his soul. So it was Aditya's plan to snatch Abhimanyu's place as he holds him responsible for his abandoning.

Geetanjali plans to rescue Abhimanyu. Rishabh reveals both families had have long enmity between them and how he loved Ragini, who was pregnant with his child and he'd to betray her to believe he had played with her for the pride of his family. Priyam turns out to be their real son Varun. As Bhavani's men had killed Ragini after she gave birth to Varun, he diverted the blame on Rishabh for revenge.

An alive Abhimanyu and Aditya jump from a cliff and fight near jail. Aditya murders Bhavani and tries to kill Geetanjali too, but Rishabh saves her and dies, while she shoots Aditya to death. Rajveer bids adieu saying he got transferred. Geetanjali and Abhimanyu reunite forever and start living happily ever after.

Cast

Main 
Surbhi Jyoti as Geetanjali "Geetu" Singh Rathore (née Shekhari) aka Gaura/Chamki: Neelanjali and Rajesh's daughter; Rishabh's sister; Kavya's adoptive sister; Rajveer's childhood friend; Abhimanyu's wife; Ragini, Aditya and Kavya's sister-in-law; Varun's aunt
Ashnoor Kaur as Young Geetanjali "Geetu" Singh Shekhari
Shoaib Ibrahim in dual role as
Captain Abhimanyu Singh Rathore: Kalyani and Bhavani Singh's twin son; Aditya and Ragini's brother; Kavya's half-brother; Geetanjali's husband; Rishabh's jijaji; Varun's uncle
Aditya Singh Rathore: Kalyani and Bhavani Singh's twin son; Abhimanyu and Ragini's brother; Kavya's half-brother; Geetanjali's devar; Varun's uncle
Sharad Kelkar as Rishabh Shekhari: Neelanjali and Rajesh's son; Geetanjali's brother; Kavya's adoptive brother; Ragini's husband; Abhimanyu, Aditya and Kavya's brother-in-law; Varun's father

Recurring 

Nivedita Bhattacharya as Ratna Shekhari (née Devi Chandrani): Bhavani's former lover and victim of rape by him; Kavya's mother; Rajesh's second wife; Rishabh and Geetanjali's step-mother; Ragini and Abhimanyu's step-mother-in-law; Varun's step-grandmother
Sreejita De as Kavya Shekhari/Kavya Singh Rathore: Ratna and Bhavani's daughter; Rajesh's adoptive daughter; Rishabh and Geetanjali's sister-in-law and adoptive sister; Rajveer's childhood friend; Abhimanyu, Aditya and Ragini's half-sister; Varun's aunt
Shaleen Malhotra as Major Rajveer Malhotra: Geetanjali and Kavya's childhood friend
Varun Buddhadev as Varun Shekhari (imposter as Priyam Khatri/Abhimanyu Singh Rathore): Ragini and Rishabh's son; Sunanda and Devki's foster son; Geetanjali, Abhimanyu, Aditya and Kavya's nephew
 Ekroop Bedi as Chanda Singh
 Megha Gupta as Ragini Shekhari: Kalyani and Bhavani Singh's daughter; Abhimanyu and Aditya's sister; Kavya's half-sister; Rishabh's wife; Geetanjali's sister-in-law; Varun's mother
Mita V as Bhairavi "Kalyani" Singh Rathore (née Devi Kashyap): Bhavani's wife; Ragini, Abhimanyu and Aditya's mother; Kavya's step-mother; Rishabh and Geetanjali's mother-in-law; Varun's grandmother
Sudesh Berry as Bhavani Singh Rathore: Ratna's former lover and rapist; Kalyani's husband; Abhimanyu, Aditya, Ragini and Kavya's father; Rishabh and Geetanjali's father-in-law; Varun's grandfather
Raj Singh Verma as Inspector Vijay Salvi
Mohit Sharma as Sevak Ram Saluja
Rushad Rana as Devki Nandan Khatri: Sunanda's husband; Varun's foster father
Sheetal Dabholkar as Sunanda Khatri: Devkinandan's wife; Varun's foster mother
Darshan Jariwala as Judge Sukesh Jaisingh
Firoza Khan as Khushi
Rajesh Kumar as Public Prosecutor Ramveer Shukla
Dipika Kakar for a special dance performance

Development 
On 26 January 2017, the first promo of the show Clock was released by Star Plus on YouTube. On 4 February 2017, the second promo of the show mystery behind the song was released by Star Plus.

The series is set in the backdrop of Rajasthan. Some of the initial scenes were shot in Bikaner, Rajasthan. Also some were shot in Gajner fort.

Reception
India Today stated, "Koi Laut Ke Aaya Hai is a spellbinding psychological thriller that captivates its viewers with interesting plots and thrilling twists. And a welcome change from the ongoing supernatural shows."

The Times of India stated that the plot of this series resembles that of the film Woh Kaun Thi?.

Recreation
In June 2021 , it was released on Hotstar on which its name was The Return. It gained 10 million + views on ott platform. The series was only of 15 episodes while the real series had 33 episodes.

References

External links 
 

StarPlus original programming
2017 Indian television series debuts
2017 Indian television series endings
Hindi-language television shows
Indian mystery television series
2010s Indian television miniseries
Serial drama television series
Television shows set in Rajasthan